Susan Howson (born 1973) is a British mathematician whose research is in the fields of algebraic number theory and arithmetic geometry.

Education and career
Howson received her PhD in mathematics from the University of Cambridge in 1998 with thesis title Iwasawa Theory of Elliptic Curves for ρ-Adic Lie Extensions under the supervision of John H. Coates.

Howson has taught at MIT, University of Cambridge, University of Oxford, and University of Nottingham.

She then left academia and studied medicine in Southampton. After graduating she became a consultant in Child and Adolescent mental health, working in the NHS in Devon.

Recognition
In 2002, Howson won the Adams Prize for her work on number theory and elliptic curves. She was the first woman to win the prize in its 120-year history. In an interview, she indicated that the competitive and single-minded nature of higher mathematics is possibly part of what discourages women from pursuing it.

She also held a Royal Society Dorothy Hodgkin Research Fellowship.

References

External links
Woman joins Adams family March 2002

Living people
British women mathematicians
20th-century British mathematicians
21st-century British mathematicians
1973 births
Place of birth missing (living people)
20th-century women mathematicians
21st-century women mathematicians